Verbascum is a genus of over 450 species of flowering plants, common name mullein, in the figwort family Scrophulariaceae. They are native to Europe and Asia, with the highest species diversity in the Mediterranean.

Mullein or "mullein leaf" often refers to the leaves of Verbascum thapsus, the great or common mullein, which is frequently used in herbal medicine.

Description
The plants first form a dense rosette of leaves at ground level, subsequently sending up a tall flowering stem. Biennial plants form the rosette the first year and the stem the following season. The leaves are spirally arranged, often densely hairy, though glabrous (hairless) in some species. The flowers have five symmetrical petals; petal colours in different species include yellow (most common), orange, red-brown, purple, blue, or white. The fruit is a capsule containing numerous minute seeds.

Cultivation

In gardening and landscaping, the mulleins are valued for their tall narrow stature and for flowering over a long period of time, even in dry soils. 

These cultivars have received the Royal Horticultural Society's Award of Garden Merit:
'Gainsborough' (Cotswold Group)
'Letitia'
'Pink Domino' (Cotswold Group)
'Tropic Sun'

Other uses

Plants of the genus have a long history of use as herbal remedies. Although this plant is a recent arrival to North America, Native Americans used the ground seeds of V. thaspus as a paralytic fish poison due to their high levels of rotenone. Verbascum flowers have been used in traditional Austrian medicine internally (as tea) or externally (as ointment, tea, baths, or compresses) for treatment of disorders of the respiratory tract, skin, veins, gastrointestinal tract, and the locomotor system.

Select species

Verbascum acaule (Bory & Chaub.) Kuntze
Verbascum adeliae Heldr.
Verbascum adenanthum Bornm.
Verbascum adrianopolitanum Podp.
Verbascum agrimoniifolium Huber-Morath
Verbascum anisophyllum Murb.
Verbascum arcturus L.
Verbascum argenteum Ten.
Verbascum austriacum Schott
Verbascum baldaccii Degen
Verbascum banaticum Schrad.
Verbascum barnadesii Vahl
Verbascum bithynicum Boiss.
Verbascum blattaria L.
Verbascum boerhavei L.
Verbascum boissieri (Heldr. & Sart. ex Boiss.) Kuntze
Verbascum botuliforme Murb.
Verbascum brevipedicellatum (Engl.) Hub.-Mor.
Verbascum bugulifolium Lam.
Verbascum calycosum Hausskn. ex Murb.
Verbascum × candelabrum Kar. & Kir.
Verbascum chaixii Vill.
Verbascum chinense (L.) Santapau
Verbascum creticum (L.f.) Cav.
Verbascum cylindrocarpum Griseb.
Verbascum cylleneum (Boiss. & Heldr.) Kuntze
Verbascum daenzeri (Fauché & Chaub.) Fenzl
Verbascum davidoffii Murb.
Verbascum decorum Velen.
Verbascum delphicum Boiss. & Heldr.
Verbascum densiflorum Bertol.
Verbascum dentifolium Delile
Verbascum dieckianum Borbás & Degen
Verbascum dingleri Mattf. & Stef.
Verbascum drymophiloides Gritzenko
Verbascum durmitoreum Rohlena
Verbascum × edirnense Dane & G.Yılmaz
Verbascum epixanthinum Boiss. & Heldr.
Verbascum eriophorum Godr.
Verbascum eskisehirensis Karavel., Ocak & Ekici
Verbascum euboicum Murb. & Rech.f.
Verbascum flavidum (Boiss.) Freyn & Bornm.
Verbascum × gabrielianae Hub.-Mor.
Verbascum georgicum Benth.
Verbascum glabratum Friv.
Verbascum glandulosum Delile
Verbascum gnaphalodes M.Bieb.
Verbascum graecum Heldr. & Sart.
Verbascum guicciardii Heldr.
Verbascum halacsyanum Sint. & Bornm. ex Halácsy
Verbascum haraldi-adnani Parolly & Eren
Verbascum hervieri Degen
Verbascum herzogii Bornm.
Verbascum humile Janka
Verbascum jankaeanum Pančić
Verbascum laciniatum (Poir.) Kuntze
Verbascum lagurus Fisch. & C.A.Mey.
Verbascum lanatum Schrad.
Verbascum lasianthum Boiss. ex Benth.
Verbascum laxum Filar. & Jav.
Verbascum leucophyllum Griseb.
Verbascum lesnovoensis Micevski
Verbascum levanticum I.K.Ferguson
Verbascum litigiosum Samp.
Verbascum longifolium Ten.
Verbascum lychnitis L.
Verbascum macedonicum Kosonin & Murb.
Verbascum macrocarpum Boiss.
Verbascum macrurum Ten.
Verbascum mallophorum Boiss. & Heldr.
Verbascum megricum Huber-Morath
Verbascum mucronatum Lam.
Verbascum nevadense Boiss.
Verbascum nicolai Rohlena
Verbascum nigrum L.
Verbascum niveum Ten.
Verbascum nobile Velen.
Verbascum nudicaule Takht.
Verbascum olympicum Boiss.
Verbascum oreophilum C. Koch
Verbascum orientale (L.) All.
Verbascum orphanideum Murb.
Verbascum ovalifolium Donn ex Sims
Verbascum ozturkii Karavel., Uzunh. & S.Çelik
Verbascum × patris Bordz.
Verbascum pelium Halácsy
Verbascum pentelicum Murb.
Verbascum phlomoides L.
Verbascum phoeniceum L.
Verbascum pinnatifidum Vahl
Verbascum pseudonobile Stoj. & Stef.
Verbascum pterocaulon Nyman
Verbascum pulverulentum Vill.
Verbascum purpureum (Janka) Hub.-Mor.
Verbascum pyramidatum M.Bieb.
Verbascum reiseri Halácsy
Verbascum roripifolium (Halácsy) I.K.Ferguson
Verbascum rotundifolium Ten.
Verbascum × rubiginosum Waldst. & Kit.
Verbascum rupestre (Davidov) I.K.Ferguson
Verbascum salgirensis Soldano
Verbascum samniticum Ten.
Verbascum schachdagense Gritzenko
Verbascum siculum Tod. ex Lojac.
Verbascum sinaiticum Benth.
Verbascum sinuatum L.
Verbascum songaricum Schrenk
Verbascum speciosum Schrad.
Verbascum spinosum L.
Verbascum suworowianum Kuntze
Verbascum szovitsianum Boiss.
Verbascum thapsus L.
Verbascum undulatum Lam.
Verbascum vandasii (Rohlena) Rohlena
Verbascum varians Freyn & Sint.
Verbascum virgatum Stokes
Verbascum xanthophoeniceum Griseb.
Verbascum zuccarinii (Boiss.) I.K.Ferguson

See also
 Mullein moth, a species in the order Lepidoptera which feeds on Verbascum and other plants.

References

Further reading
Flora Europaea: Verbascum
Flora of China: Verbascum
Davis, P. H., Edmondson, J. R., Mill, R. R., & Parris, B. S., eds. (1978). Flora of Turkey and the East Aegean Islands 6: 461.

External links

Verbascum.org

Verbascum
Medicinal plants
Scrophulariaceae genera